The Âu Việt or Nam Cương were an ancient conglomeration of Baiyue tribes living in what is today the mountainous regions of northernmost Vietnam, western Guangdong, and northern Guangxi, China, since at least the third century BCE. They were believed to have belonged to the Tai-Kadai language group. In the legends of the Tay people, the western part of Âu Việt's land became the Nam Cương Kingdom, whose capital was located in what is today the Cao Bằng Province of Northeast Vietnam. At some point they split and became the Western Ou (Nam Cương) and the Eastern Ou (Dong'ou). In the late 3rd century BC, Thục Phán, a descendant of the last ruler of Shu, came to rule Western Ou (Xi'ou or Nam Cương).

The Âu Việt traded with the Lạc Việt, the inhabitants of the state of Văn Lang, located in the lowland plains to Âu Việt's south, in what is today the Red River Delta of northern Vietnam, until 258 BC or 257 BC, when Thục Phán, the leader of an alliance of Âu Việt tribes, invaded Văn Lang and defeated the last Hùng king. He named the new nation "Âu Lạc", proclaiming himself "An Dương Vương" (literally "Peaceful Virile King").

According to Chinese historians:

 The Qin dynasty conquered the state of Chu, unifying China. Qin abolished the noble status of the royal descendants of the state of Yue. After some years, Qin Shi Huang sent an army of 500,000 to conquer the Âu Việt. After three years, Qin forces killed Âu Việt chief Yiyusong (譯籲宋). Even so, Âu Việt waged guerilla warfare against Qin and slew Qin commander Tu Sui (屠睢) in retaliation.
 Before the Han dynasty, the Âu Việt and Dong'ou regained independence. The Dong'ou was attacked by the Minyue Kingdom, and Emperor Wu of Han allowed them to move to between the Yangtze and the Huai River. Âu Việt paid tribute to Nanyue until it was conquered by Nanyue. Descendants of these kings later lost their royal status. Ou (區), Ou (歐) and Ouyang (歐陽) remain as family names.

According to Vietnamese historians:

 257 BC, An Dương Vương 安陽王 annexed the Lạc Việt tribe of Hung Kings 雄王 (Hưng Vương) with his Âu Việt tribe into a single tribe (Âu Lạc).
 208 BC, Zhao Tuo captured Âu Lạc and incorporated it into his kingdom of Nanyue.
 In 938, Ngô Quyền 吳權 defeated the Southern Han army, opening a long period of independent Vietnam under the full monarchy.

The Âu Việt tribe is thought to have been one of the most important progenitors of the Vietnamese people, along with the Lạc Việt people and some of ancient Han Chinese customs and traditions that was imparted onto Vietnamese culture during Northern Rule.

References

Source 
 

3rd-century BC Asian people
Ancient peoples of China
Former countries in Chinese history
Ancient Vietnam
Nanyue
History of Guangxi
History of Guangdong
Tai peoples
Tày people
Zhuang people